Robert J. Larson is a former member of the Wisconsin State Assembly.

Biography
Larson was born on December 4, 1932, in Osseo, Wisconsin. During the Korean War, Larson served in the United States Air Force. He later graduated from the University of Wisconsin–Eau Claire, the University of Wisconsin–Stout and the University of Minnesota. Larson is married with four children and six grandchildren.

Political career
Larson was first elected to the Assembly in 1978. He is a Republican.

References

1932 births
Living people
Republican Party members of the Wisconsin State Assembly
Military personnel from Wisconsin
United States Air Force airmen
United States Air Force personnel of the Korean War
University of Wisconsin–Eau Claire alumni
University of Wisconsin–Stout alumni
University of Minnesota alumni
People from Osseo, Wisconsin